Agarakadzor is a village in the Areni Municipality of the Vayots Dzor Province in Armenia. Two kilometers from the village is a 13th-century bridge that once served as the main route to Julfa, two kilometers to the east is a 13-15th century cemetery.

Toponymy 
The village was previously known as Ayar.

Gallery

References

External links 

 
 
 

Populated places in Vayots Dzor Province